Philorene is a genus of sea snails, marine gastropod mollusks in the family Skeneidae.

Description
The subdiscoidal shell is umbilicate. The spire is depressed. The whorls are rounded and the body whorl is descending. The aperture is circular. The peristome is continuous.

Species
Species within the genus Philorene include:
 Philorene texturata Oliver, 1915

References

External links
 To World Register of Marine Species

 
Skeneidae
Monotypic gastropod genera